Christopher John Hodson  is a New Zealand barrister and judge, Judge Advocate General of the New Zealand Armed Forces, and the Chief Judge of the Court Martial of New Zealand.

Early life
Hodson was born in Masterton, where he grew up on his family's hill country farm. He graduated from the Victoria University of Wellington in 1966 with an LLB degree.

Career
Hodson was admitted to the Bar in 1966, and from 1966–82, was a Partner in Major Gooding & Partners in Masterton.

In 1983, Hodson became a partner in Macalister Mazengarb Parkin & Rose in Wellington, before commencing practice as a barrister sole in 1991, where he specialised in medical and military law. He was appointed Queen's Counsel in 1998.

He is Judge Advocate General of the New Zealand Armed Forces, and the Chief Judge of the Court Martial of New Zealand, and also vice-president of the International Equestrian Federation.

He served in the Territorial Force (reserve) of the New Zealand Army, retiring as a lieutenant colonel in 1992.

Personal life
Hodson had three children with his first wife. In 1992, he married fellow judge and barrister Dame Lowell Goddard, who has a daughter from her first marriage to Sir John Scott, 5th Baronet, in 1969.

References

Year of birth missing (living people)
Victoria University of Wellington alumni
New Zealand King's Counsel
People from Masterton
Living people